P. Sathidevi (born 29 November 1956) is an Indian politician and was a member of the 14th Lok Sabha of India. She represented Vatakara constituency of Kerala and is a member of the Communist Party of India (Marxist). She is serving as the chairperson of Kerala Women's Commission since 1 October 2021. She is now selected as Central Committee Member of CPI(M).

Life
She was born in 1956 to Kunhiraman and Deviamma. In 1984, she married M. Dasan.

References

External links
 Members of Fourteenth Lok Sabha - Parliament of India website

1956 births
Living people
India MPs 2004–2009
21st-century Indian women politicians
21st-century Indian politicians
Communist Party of India (Marxist) politicians from Kerala
Lok Sabha members from Kerala
People from Thalassery
Politicians from Kozhikode
Women in Kerala politics